The Zitai or Zhitai Formation is a geological sequence of Middle Ordovician origin, that occurs along the southeastern edge of the Yangtze Platform in southern China. It is a purple-red limestone with a few interspersed yellow-green shale beds. It contains a fossil fauna dominated by trilobites and nautiloids.

References 

Geologic formations of China
Ordovician System of Asia
Paleozoic China
Dapingian
Darriwilian
Floian
Limestone formations
Ordovician northern paleotropical deposits
Paleontology in Anhui
Paleontology in Hubei
Paleontology in Hunan